Charles Gilpin (November 17, 1809 - October 29, 1891) was an American attorney and politician. He served as the mayor of Philadelphia from 1851 to 1854 and was the last mayor of the city before the consolidation of Philadelphia.

Early life
Gilpin was born on November 17, 1809 in Wilmington, Delaware to Edward and Lydia (Grubb) Gilpin. His father Edward was a merchant whose family immigrated to the United States in the 1600s.  He studied at the Germantown Academy and read law under the tutelage of Joseph Ingersoll. Gilpin was admitted to the bar in 1834 and practiced law in Philadelphia.

Political career
Gilpin won a seat on the Common Council, the lower house of the Philadelphia City Council, and to the Select Council in 1840. He ran for mayor in 1849 as a member of the Whig party; but lost by a 65-vote margin to Joel Jones.

In 1850, he ran again and defeated Jones by 2,329 votes. He won re-election in 1851 over former mayor John Swift and was re-elected in 1952 and 1853. As mayor, he sat on the committee to rewrite the city charter. The consolidation combined the city of Philadelphia and Philadelphia County, created new offices such as the city treasurer, city controller, and expanded the powers of the city government. When the Whig party broke up, he joined with the Republican party.

With the change in city government, Gilpin did not run for re-election as mayor. He worked as the solicitor to the Philadelphia County Sheriff from 1858 to 1883. In 1864, President Abraham Lincoln nominated him as a United States Attorney for the Eastern District of Pennsylvania and he served in that role for four years. He was also the supervisor of elections.

Personal life
He was one of the founders of the Olympic Base Ball Club which played their games in Camden, New Jersey across the river from Philadelphia.

He was a member of the Union League of Philadelphia and the Philadelphia Club.

He was a staunch supporter of the Union in the American Civil War. He was an originator and founder of the Gray Reserve Regiment in 1861. He was too old to fight in the war, but supported two substitutes who fought on his behalf.

Gilpin married Sarah Hamilton in 1843. They had six children, Washington Hood Gilpin, who was an attorney in Philadelphia, Charles Jr., Lydia, Henry, Hood and Bernard.

He died October 29, 1891 in Philadelphia and was interred at Laurel Hill Cemetery.

References

External links

1809 births
1891 deaths
19th-century American lawyers
19th-century American politicians
American lawyers admitted to the practice of law by reading law
Burials at Laurel Hill Cemetery (Philadelphia)
Gilpin family
Germantown Academy alumni
Lawyers from Philadelphia
Mayors of Philadelphia
Pennsylvania Republicans
Pennsylvania Whigs
People from Wilmington, Delaware
Philadelphia City Council members
United States Attorneys for the Eastern District of Pennsylvania